Thomas Ring (8 August 1930 – 5 October 1997) was a Scottish footballer, who played at outside left for Ashfield Juniors, Clyde, Everton, Barnsley, Aberdeen, Fraserburgh, Stevenage Town and for Scotland.

Club career
Ring was born in Glasgow and is best known for his time with Clyde, during which he won the Scottish Cup in 1954–55 and also in 1957–58. Ring scored the winning goal in the 1955 Scottish Cup Final replay versus Celtic.

He started out as a promising junior player with Ashfield. After he represented an RAF XI against Blackpool Reserves, an opposition scout tried to recruit him. He'd already joined the Bullywee, but that scout turned out to be ex Clyde captain Danny Blair.

Clyde also won the Division Two title twice in 1951–52 and 1956–57. He scored 178 goals in 384 appearances for the club in national competitions.

Ring was transferred to Everton in January 1960 for £12,000. He made a significant contribution for the Toffees in the 1960–61 season; many headlines were written concerning him, such as 'Blues could just Ring for service'.

Ring departed Goodison Park after a broken leg injury in November 1961 and then signed for Barnsley. He returned to Scotland in 1963 to sign for Aberdeen for a short spell before ending his career with further brief spells at Fraserburgh in the Highland League and then Stevenage Town in the Southern League.

International career

In the 1950s, Ring along with Harry Haddock, and Archie Robertson, were three of 49 junior players to later earn full international honours for that decade.

Ring was capped a dozen times for Scotland whilst playing for the Bully Wee and scored two goals, with one versus the famous Hungary team with Ferenc Puskás during the 1954–55 season. The other was scored versus England at Wembley in 1957. Ring scored in the first minute, although England went on to win 2–1.

He was the second Division Two player to be capped against the auld enemy, and he remains the last. Five of his twelve caps were awarded in Division Two. Ring also represented the Scottish League XI.

International goals 

Scores and results list for Scotland's, Scottish League XI's, and Glasgow's goal tally first.

In popular culture
Ring's name is now a running gag on BBC Radio Scotland's Off the Ball radio programme, as his surname has multiple connotations. This ensures that he makes it into the show's 'team of the week' almost every Saturday.

Honours

Clyde
 Scottish Cup: 1954–55, 1957–58
 Scottish Division Two: 1951–52, 1956–57
 Supplementary Cup: 1951–52
 Glasgow Cup: 1951–52, 1958–59
 Glasgow Charity Cup: 1951–52, 1957–58

Everton
 Liverpool Senior Cup: 1959–60

Individual
 Clyde FC Hall of Fame: Inducted, 2016
 Abbeyleix Hall of Fame

References

External links

Clyde Hall of Fame profile Clyde FC.
Career Statistics Neil Brown Newcastle Fans.

1930 births
1997 deaths
Association football wingers
Scottish footballers
Scotland international footballers
Ashfield F.C. players
Clyde F.C. players
Everton F.C. players
Barnsley F.C. players
Aberdeen F.C. players
Fraserburgh F.C. players
Stevenage Town F.C. players
Scottish Football League players
English Football League players
Scottish Football League representative players
Scottish Junior Football Association players
Highland Football League players